Marco Mukoso Hausiku (25 November 1953 – 26 August 2021) was a Namibian politician who was deputy Prime Minister of Namibia from 2010 to 2015. Previously he served as Minister of Foreign Affairs from 2004 to 2010. In 2017 he was elected deputy secretary general of the Swapo Party at the party's 6th congress.

Life and career
Hausiku was born on 25 November 1953 in Kapako, Okavango Region (now Kavango West). Immediately prior to independence, Hausiku was a SWAPO delegate to the Constituent Assembly which was in place from November 1989 to March 1990, and since 1990 he has been a member of the National Assembly of Namibia. He served as Minister of Lands, Resettlement and Rehabilitation from 1990 to 1992, as Minister of Works, Transport and Communication from 1992 to March 1995 and as Minister of Prisons and Correctional Services from March 1995 to August 2002. He was appointed Minister of Labour on 27 August 2002, and after nearly two years in that position he was appointed Minister of Foreign Affairs by president Sam Nujoma on 27 May 2004. This appointment followed Nujoma's dismissal of the previous foreign minister, Hidipo Hamutenya, in the midst of a struggle within SWAPO regarding the nomination of a presidential candidate.

Hausiku received the 16th highest number of votes, 345, in the election to the central committee of SWAPO at the party's August 2002 congress. He was SWAPO's Secretary for External Relations as of January 2008.

Amidst a push for new faces in the National Assembly, Hausiku opted not to seek a spot on the SWAPO list for the 2014 election. After leaving parliament, he was designated as rector of the Swapo Party School, which was launched in May 2016. He was intended to serve as rector in an interim capacity for the school's first year.

Death
Haufiku died on 26 August 2021 on post-COVID-19 complications. He was buried at Heroes' Acre outside Windhoek on 11 September.

References

1953 births
2021 deaths
People from Kavango Region
SWAPO politicians
Deputy Prime Ministers of Namibia
Foreign ministers of Namibia
Transport ministers of Namibia
Works and transport ministers of Namibia
Labour ministers of Namibia
Security ministers of Namibia
Land reform ministers of Namibia
Members of the National Assembly (Namibia)